Leslie Peter Benzies (born 17 January 1971) is a Scottish video game producer and the former president of Rockstar North, a subsidiary of Rockstar Games. He was the lead developer on the Grand Theft Auto series, taking responsibility from Grand Theft Auto III to Grand Theft Auto V (including Grand Theft Auto Online). Benzies left Rockstar in 2016, and was in a lawsuit with its parent company, Take-Two Interactive, over unpaid royalties from April 2016 to February 2019.

Early life
Benzies was born in Aberdeen but moved far to Elgin when he was young. When Benzies was 11, his father Leonard purchased a Dragon 32 computer. Benzies taught himself how to program and wrote his first game.

Career 
Benzies' professional career as a video game programmer began in 1995 at DMA Design (now Rockstar North), where he was team lead developing the Nintendo 64 video game Space Station Silicon Valley. This game was released in October 1998, after which he started assembling the team that would create Grand Theft Auto III.

In 2005, he and Sam Houser, President of Rockstar Games, received a BAFTA Special Award.

In June 2014, he announced a deal to purchase the St Stephen's Church in Stockbridge, Edinburgh for a little over £500,000. He plans to preserve the building and create a trust composed of members of the community to manage it.

Benzies took sabbatical leave from Rockstar on 1 September 2014. In January 2016 it was announced that he had left the company. Benzies later claimed that he was persuaded to take the sabbatical, during which his son and several of his friends were fired from the company and his email access was suspended; when he attempted to return to work, he was ordered to leave by the office manager and says that the company made "scurrilous allegations" about his actions at work. On 12 April 2016, Benzies started legal action against Rockstar Games and its parent Take-Two Interactive claiming $150 million in unpaid royalties.

In January 2017, he set up five new companies including Royal Circus Games which intends to develop games for consoles, PCs and mobile devices.

On 29 March 2018, Benzies' litigation against Rockstar and Take-Two suffered a significant setback when the companies succeeded in dismissing 12 out of 18 of his claims, though the court did rule that Benzies "remains entitled to receive certain royalties" as part of his compensation.

On 1 October 2018, it was announced that Benzies' new company was called Build a Rocket Boy Games. The company has raised £32 million from investors in China and New York for its upcoming game Everywhere.

On 7 February 2019, Benzies' litigation with Take-Two ended with a confidential settlement.

Works

References

1971 births
Living people
Academy of Interactive Arts & Sciences Hall of Fame inductees
BAFTA winners (people)
British video game designers
People from Aberdeen
People from Elgin, Moray
Rockstar Games
Video game producers